The 1969–70 Minnesota North Stars season was the North Stars' third season.

Coached by Wren Blair (9–13–10) and Charlie Burns (10–22–12), the team compiled a record of 19–35–22 for 60 points, to finish the regular season third in the West Division. In the playoffs they lost the quarter-finals 4–2 to the St. Louis Blues.

Offseason

Regular season

Final standings

Schedule and results

Playoffs

By finishing the regular season in third place in the West Division, the Minnesota North Stars qualified for the Stanley Cup playoffs in 1970 and faced the first-place St. Louis Blues in a best-of-seven quarterfinal series.  St. Louis won the first two games at home, 6-2 and 2-1.  Minnesota won the next two games at home by scores of 4-2 and 4-0. The Blues won game five in St. Louis, 6-3, and also won game six in Minnesota, 4-2, to win the series in six games.

Stanley Cup Quarterfinals

Blues win series 4–2

Player statistics

Awards and records

Transactions

Draft picks
Minnesota's draft picks at the 1968 NHL Amateur Draft held at the Queen Elizabeth Hotel in Montreal, Quebec.

Farm teams

See also
1969–70 NHL season

References

External links
 

Minnesota
Minnesota
Minnesota North Stars seasons
Minnesota North Stars
Minnesota North Stars